My Autobiography of Carson McCullers is a memoir by Jenn Shapland, published April 2, 2020 by Tin House Books. In 2021, the book won the Judy Grahn Award for Lesbian Nonfiction, the Lambda Literary Award for Lesbian Memoir, and the Phi Beta Kappa Christian Gauss Award. Along with being longlisted for the Andrew Carnegie Medal for Excellence in Nonfiction, it was a finalist for the National Book Award for Nonfiction and a Stonewall Book Award Honor Book.

Reception

Reviews 
Prior to publication, My Autobiography of Carson McCullers was named one of the most anticipated queer books of the year by Lit Hub, Buzzfeed, Forbes, Electric Literature, and Oprah Magazine.

Following publication, the book received positive reviews from Booklist, Kirkus Reviews, The New York Times Book Review, The A.V. Club, Los Angeles Review of Books, The Times, Full Stop, The New York Review of Books, The Georgia Review, Star Tribune, The Rumpus, Lambda Literary, Autostraddle, Library Journal, The New Yorker, and Open Letters Review.

In various reviews, the book was called "revelatory", "stimulating", "gorgeous, brilliant", and "a moving record of love at the margins". The New York Review of Books referred to it as "part fan letter, part detective story, and part steely corrective".

The Los Angeles Times and The New Republic offered mixed reviews.

The Guardian's Rachel Cook provided a poor review, saying, "My Autobiography of Carson McCullers, as its too-clever-by-half-sounding title implies, is neither memoir nor biography... such a declaration cannot disguise the fact that her (over) identification with McCullers takes us nowhere that is very productive." In a similarly disappointed review, Publishers Weekly said, "Shapland’s intermingled autobiography and biography of McCullers’s life unsatisfyingly blurs what is real and what is imagined."

Awards

References 

Lambda Literary Award-winning works
2020 books
American memoirs
LGBT literature in the United States
2020s LGBT literature
2020 non-fiction books
Books about writers
Tin House books